Abdul Qadir Djaelani (20 October 1938 – 23 February 2021) was an Indonesian Islamic preacher, writer, activist, and politician who served as member of parliament for period 2000–2004.

Djaelani died on 23 February 2021.

References

1938 births
2021 deaths
Indonesian Islamic religious leaders
Crescent Star Party (Indonesia) politicians